Royal Greens Golf & Country Club is a golf club located in King Abdullah Economic City, around 100 km north of Jeddah, Saudi Arabia. It has hosted tournaments on the European Tour, Asian Tour, and the Ladies European Tour. It is scheduled to host one of eight tournaments in the inaugural season of the LIV Golf Invitational Series, financed by the Public Investment Fund, the sovereign wealth fund of Saudi Arabia.

History
The 18-hole championship golf course, playing to a 72 par and a maximum length of just over 7,000 yards, officially opened in September 2017. It sits on the Red Sea coast and was designed by European Golf Design (EGD) and is managed by Troon Golf, the world's largest operator of competition grade courses.

Scorecard

Scorecard from the 2020 Saudi International and the 2022 Saudi Ladies International.

International tournaments 
The club has hosted several international championships, including the Saudi International on the European Tour and later the Asian Tour, and the Saudi Ladies International and Saudi Ladies Team International on the Ladies European Tour.

Winners

Awards and recognition 
In addition, Royal Greens Golf & Country Club has won numerous awards, such as Saudi Arabia's Best Golf Course and Middle East's Best Golf Course at the 2021 World Golf Awards.

References

External links

Golf clubs and courses in Saudi Arabia